Edward Ward (April 3, 1900 – September 26, 1971) was an American film composer and music director who was nominated for seven Academy Awards.

Academy Award nominations
1939 Best Original Song for "Always and Always" from Mannequin 
1942 Best Scoring of a Dramatic Picture (Cheers for Miss Bishop)
1942 Best Scoring of a Dramatic Picture (Tanks a Million)
1942 Best Scoring of a Musical Picture (All-American Co-Ed)
1943 Best Original Song for "Pennies for Peppino" from Flying with Music 
1943 Best Scoring of a Musical Picture (Flying with Music)
1944 Best Scoring of a Musical Picture (Phantom of the Opera)

Additional credits
No No Nanette (1930)
Kismet (1930)
Great Expectations (1934)
The Bishop Misbehaves (1935)
The Mystery of Edwin Drood (1935)
San Francisco (1936)
Camille (1936)
The Gorgeous Hussy (1936)
Night Must Fall (1937)
Maytime (1937)
Saratoga (1937)
A Yank at Oxford (1938)
The Shopworn Angel (1938) 
Boys Town (1938) 
The Women (1939)
 Ali Baba And The Forty Thieves (1944)
The Babe Ruth Story (1948)
Man of a Thousand Faces (1957)

References

External links
 
 Edward Ward papers, 1891–1961 at California Digital Library

American film score composers
American male film score composers
1971 deaths
20th-century classical musicians
20th-century American composers
20th-century American male musicians
1900 births